The Dadeville Historic District is a historic district that comprises the central portion of Dadeville, Alabama. The period of significance extends from 1842, when the district's oldest building was built, to 1970, when commercial development began to move to the outskirts of town.

The Dadeville Historic District was placed on the National Register of Historic Places on July 10, 2013.

References

External links

 

Historic districts on the National Register of Historic Places in Alabama
Historic American Buildings Survey in Alabama
Historic districts in Tallapoosa County, Alabama
National Register of Historic Places in Tallapoosa County, Alabama